Ueki may refer to:

Ueki (surname)
Ueki, Kumamoto, a former town in Japan

See also
The Law of Ueki, manga series